

The Alvand class or Saam class was originally a class of four frigates built for the Imperial Iranian Navy. They were renamed after the Iranian Revolution, and served in the Islamic Republic of Iran Navy during Iran-Iraq War. Three still remain in service. A fourth was sunk by the U.S. Navy in 1988.

Development and construction

The ships were built in the United Kingdom by Vosper Ltd and based on their Mark 5 design with the following arms & equipment:

ASuW - 1 × quintuple Sea Killer Mk2 surface-to-surface missile
AAW - 1 × triple Sea Cat surface-to-air missile launcher 
ASW 1 × 3 barrelled Anti Submarine Mortar Mark 10 Limbo launcher
Guns - 1 × Mark 8 Mod 0 4.5 inch general purpose & 1 × twin 35mm Oerlikon AA
Electronics - Plessey AWS 1 air surveillance radar with on-mounted IFF; 2 × Contraves Seahunter systems (For use with Sea cat, Sea Killer & the 35mm mount); Decca RDL 1 passive direction finding equipment

They were refitted in the UK shortly before the 1979 Iranian Revolution.

History
The ships were originally named after characters from Ferdowsi's Shahnameh. After the Islamic Revolution they were renamed after mountains in Iran.

They saw action during the "Tanker War" phase of the Iran–Iraq War and proved effective against Iraqi forces. After one was sunk, and other significant losses taken, during Operation Praying Mantis they saw little further use as the Iranian Navy proved no match for the U.S. Navy.

Upgrades

The Sea Killer missiles were replaced by Chinese made C-802s in the 1990s. The Sea Cats were replaced by the addition of a  AA gun.

Two triple  torpedo tubes, two  mortars and two 0.50 caliber machine guns were also fitted.

Successors
The  is a modified Iranian-built version of the Alvand class, with five either in service or under construction.

Ships in the class

See also
 Islamic Republic of Iran Navy
 Current Iranian Navy vessels

References

External links

Photos of Alvand-class frigates in Operation Praying Mantis

Sources 
https://web.archive.org/web/20160303224923/http://www.iinavy.org/faramarz.htm
http://www.mafhoum.com/press8/237P2.pdf
https://web.archive.org/web/20041222105239/http://www.ii.uj.edu.pl/~artur/enc/F2.htm

 

Frigate classes
 
Iran–United Kingdom military relations
Ship classes of the Islamic Republic of Iran Navy